Hispidulin is a naturally occurring flavone with potential antiepileptic activity in rats and gerbils. It is found in plants including Grindelia argentina, Arrabidaea chica, Saussurea involucrate, Crossostephium chinense, Artemisia, and Salvia.

Complementary medicine
In traditional and complementary medicine it is claimed to have "antioxidant, antifungal, anti-inflammatory, antimutagenic, and antineoplastic properties".

Notes

Anticonvulsants
O-methylated flavones
Flavones
GABAA receptor positive allosteric modulators